Egregia is a genus of planthoppers in the family Fulgoridae, subfamily Aphaeninae. Species are distributed in Malesia.

Species

References

Auchenorrhyncha genera
Aphaeninae